The Dodge Zeo was a concept car built by Dodge. The 2+2 car was shown on 14 January 2008 at the 2008 North American International Auto Show.

All electric vehicle 

The Zeo was a four-passenger sport wagon, powered by a single  electric motor with a lithium-ion battery. It is rear wheel drive and could accelerate from 0-60 mph (97 km/h) in 5.7 seconds. It featured conventional scissor doors in the front and rear hinged scissor doors in the back.

Plug-in hybrid 

A series plug-in hybrid version was expected to have a  only-electric range.

The company said it expected to outsource much of the production, had not selected partners, and had no timetable for production.  In the event, the Dodge ZEO never saw production.

References

External links 

 
Dodge Zeo Concept
Chrysler to Show Dealers Electric Car  (The Wall Street Journal).
Data and pictures of the Dodge ZEO

Electric concept cars
ZEO
Plug-in hybrid vehicles